Siberian Scientific Agricultural Library is a library in Krasnoobsk, Russia. It was founded in 1971.

History
The library was organized in 1971.

In 1988, it moved to a new building.

Library holdings
The library holds more than 650,000 documents (periodicals, books, unpublished technical literature, etc.) on forestry, agriculture and fisheries, hunting, agricultural construction, environmental protection.

The library has agricultural journals issued since 1890 ("Vestnik Zhivotnovodstva", "Vestnik Obshchestvennoi Veterinarii", etc.). It stores about 2000 documents on agriculture (late 18th and early 19th centuries).

The library has a large collection of publications of scientific organizations of the Siberian Branch of the Russian Academy of Agricultural Sciences (scientific works, monographs, scientific and methodological recommendations, scientific and technical bulletins, etc.).

Bibliography

External links
 Siberian Scientific Agricultural Library – Branch of the State Public Scientific-Technological Library of the Siberian Branch of the RAS.

Libraries in Russia
Libraries established in 1971
Krasnoobsk